Muhammad al-Juhani may refer to:
Khalid Ibn Muhammad Al-Juhani (19752003), participated in the Riyadh compound bombings
Muhamad Naji Subhi Al Juhani (born 1967), former Guantanamo captive from Saudi Arabia on the Timeline of the release and transfer of Guantanamo Bay detainees